is a cape located east of Tokyo Bay in Futtsu, Chiba in Japan.

References 

Cape Futtsu - Chiba Prefecture

Futtsu
Landforms of Chiba Prefecture
Spits (landform)

Shoals of Japan